Armando Antonio Gun Caballero (born 17 January 1986) is a Panamanian professional footballer who currently plays for Independiente La Chorrera as a left-back.

Club career
Gun played for several Panamanian league clubs and had spells abroad with Colombian side América de Cali and Costa Rican outfit Alajuelense, whom he left after the 2006 Apertura season.

In January 2013, Gun moved to Río Abajo then returned to Chepo in summer 2013 but left for Independiente La Chorrera in December 2014.

International career
Gun was one of the only members of the Panama U-20 squad who have participated at both the 2003 FIFA World Youth Championship in the United Arab Emirates and the 2005 FIFA World Youth Championship in the Netherlands.

He made his senior debut for the Panama national football team in a January 2005 friendly match against Ecuador and has earned a total of 19 caps, scoring no goals. He represented his country in one FIFA World Cup qualification match and played at the 2005 and 2009 UNCAF Nations Cups as well as at the 2009 CONCACAF Gold Cup.

His final international match was a 2009 CONCACAF Gold Cup match against the United States.

References

External links

1986 births
Living people
Sportspeople from Panama City
Association football defenders
Panamanian footballers
Panama international footballers
2005 UNCAF Nations Cup players
2009 UNCAF Nations Cup players
2009 CONCACAF Gold Cup players
Copa Centroamericana-winning players
Unión Deportivo Universitario players
San Francisco F.C. players
América de Cali footballers
L.D. Alajuelense footballers
Chepo FC players
C.D. Plaza Amador players
Sporting San Miguelito players
Panamanian expatriate footballers
Expatriate footballers in Colombia
Expatriate footballers in Costa Rica
Categoría Primera A players
Liga FPD players